was a feudal domain under the Tokugawa shogunate of Edo period Japan.  It is located in Musashi Province, Honshū. The domain was centered at Kawagoe Castle, located in what is the city of Kawagoe in Saitama Prefecture.

History
The domain had its beginning in 1590, when Toyotomi Hideyoshi defeated the later Hōjō clan in the Siege of Odawara. Hideyoshi awarded vast Hōjō holdings to Tokugawa Ieyasu, who enfeoffed Sakai Shigetada as daimyō of Kawagoe with a assessed kokudaka of 10,000 koku. Shigetada was transferred in 1601, and the next daimyō was appointed in 1609.

Afterwards, the domain was reassigned every couple of generations to a large number of fudai daimyō clans, spending the longest time under the control of a branch of the Echizen Matsudaira clan (1767–1867) with a rating of 170,000 koku.

The final daimyō of Kawagoe, Matsudaira Yasutoshi, served as domain governor until 1871, and was awarded the title of shishaku (marquis) under the kazoku peerage system. Kawagoe Domain subsequently became part of Saitama Prefecture.

Bakumatsu period holdings
As with most domains in the han system, Kawagoe Domain consisted of several discontinuous territories calculated to provide the assigned kokudaka, based on periodic cadastral surveys and projected agricultural yields.
Musashi Province
1 village in Hiki District
104 villages in Iruma District
2 villages in Hanzawa District
1 village in Chichibu District
Hitachi Province
27 villages in Taga District
Mikawa Province
1 village in Hazu District
Ōmi Province
5 villages in Yasu District
12 villages in Kōka District
33 villages in Gamō District
8 villages in Takashima District

List of daimyōs

See also
List of Han

References
The content of this article was largely derived from that of the corresponding article on Japanese Wikipedia.

External links
 Kawagoe Domain on "Edo 300 HTML"

Notes

Domains of Japan
History of Saitama Prefecture
Musashi Province
Hotta clan
Maebashi-Matsudaira clan
Matsui-Matsudaira clan
Ōkōchi-Matsudaira clan
Sakai clan